Francisco Manuel Ruivo Ferreira Romãozinho (28 March 1943 – 12 March 2020) was Portuguese professional rally driver who competed in the 1970s.

Romãozinho, driving a Citroën DS21 and partnered by José Bernardo, achieved his best result in the World Rally Championship at the 1973 Rallye de Portugal, his home event, by finishing third.

References

1943 births
2020 deaths
Portuguese rally drivers